Junri Namigata and Kotomi Takahata were the defending champions, but both players chose to participate with different partners. Namigata partnered Arina Rodionova, while Takahata played alongside Megumi Nishimoto. Takahata and Nishimoto beat Namigata and Rodionova in the first round, however they lost to Tara Moore and Amra Sadiković in the quarterfinals.

Naomi Broady and Asia Muhammad won the title after defeating Moore and Sadiković 6–2, 6–0 in the final.

Seeds

Draw

Draw

References
Main Draw

Fukuoka International Women's Cup - Doubles
Fukuoka International Women's Cup